John Georges "Buck" Boucher (August 19, 1895 – October 17, 1960) was a Canadian professional ice hockey defenceman who played for the Ottawa Senators, Montreal Maroons, and Chicago Black Hawks in the National Hockey Association and National Hockey League between 1915 and 1932. Born in Ottawa, Ontario, Buck was one of six brothers. His brothers Frank, Bobby and Billy all played in the NHL. Their father Tom Boucher, played rugby football, winning the Canadian championship in 1894, 1896, 1897 and 1901. Boucher started his professional athletic career in football as halfback for the Ottawa Rough Riders of the Canadian Football League. After three years of football he switched to hockey.

Personal life

Georges was one of six sons born to Tom Boucher and Annie Carroll. His paternal grandfather, Antoine Boucher was French while his other grandparents were Irish in descent. His younger brothers Billy, Bob and Frank would also become professional ice hockey players. There were two other brothers, Carroll and Joseph, and two sisters, Irene and Lily. Their father Tom played rugby football, both for Ottawa College and for the Ottawa Rough Riders, winning the Canadian championship in 1894, 1896, 1897 and 1901. On the Ottawa Rough Riders, Tom Boucher was a teammate of Tom "King" Clancy, whose son was the famous hockey player Frank "King" Clancy.

In October 1916 Boucher enlisted with the Canadian military, joining the 207th (Ottawa-Carleton) Battalion, though he was discharged in December that year for unclear reasons. He re-enlisted in May 1917, this time joining the Signal Training Department. However he was again discharged, this time on account of a medical exam finding him to have a mitral regurgitation, or leaky heart, which made Boucher unfit to be a soldier.

Buck's son, Frank Boucher, was the head coach of Canada's 1948 Olympic gold medal-winning ice hockey team – the Ottawa RCAF Flyers.

Hockey career
He played as an amateur with the Ottawa Aberdeens and the New Edinburghs and Royal Canadians of the Ottawa City Hockey League teams. He started play with the Senators, then of the NHA, in 1915. At the time, he played as a forward.

Boucher would soon switch to play as a defenceman where he would gain fame as an excellent stick handler. He would play with stars such as Eddie Gerard, Horrace Merrill, Sprague Cleghorn, Lionel Hitchman and King Clancy.

Boucher played against his brother Frank in the 1923 Stanley Cup playoffs, which also featured brothers Cy and Corbett Denneny playing against each other. It marked the first time two different sets of brothers faced each other in an NHL or Big Four championship series.

Boucher helped lead the Senators to four Stanley Cup champtionships between 1920 and 1927. He played in the NHL from 1917 to 1932, scoring 117 goals and 87 recorded assists in 449 games. An extremely tough customer, he also had 838 penalty minutes, including 115 in just 44 games in 1926–27. At his retirement in 1932 he ranked 11th among NHL career points leaders.

He would go on to coach in the NHL in Ottawa, Boston and St. Louis. He would coach the Ottawa Senators of the Quebec Hockey League to the Allan Cup in 1949.

He suffered from throat cancer for six years and was inducted into the Hockey Hall of Fame in 1960, three weeks before he died.

Career statistics

Regular season and playoffs

Coaching record

References

Bibliography

External links
 
 

1895 births
1960 deaths
Boston Bruins coaches
Boston Cubs players
Canadian football running backs
Canadian ice hockey coaches
Canadian ice hockey defencemen
Chicago Blackhawks players
Deaths from esophageal cancer
Franco-Ontarian people
Hockey Hall of Fame inductees
Ice hockey people from Ottawa
Montreal Maroons players
Ottawa Rough Riders players
Ottawa Senators (1917) players
Ottawa Senators (NHA) players
Players of Canadian football from Ontario
Stanley Cup champions